Oslo Cup may refer to:
Oslo Cup (curling), a curling tournament
Oslo Cup (horserace), a horserace